Peter Robert Bain Wilson (born 31 October 1944) is a South African first-class cricketer and field hockey player.

Wilson was born at Bulawayo in Southern Rhodesia in October 1944. He studied engineering as the University of Cape Town, later studying in England as a Rhodes Scholar at St Edmund Hall at the University of Oxford. While studying at Oxford, he played first-class cricket for Oxford University, making his debut against Gloucestershire at Oxford in 1968. He played first-class cricket for Oxford until 1970, making 23 appearances. Wilson scored a total of 664 runs in his 23 matches, at an average of 17.47 and with a high score of 94. With his leg break bowling, he took 7 wickets with best figures of 4 for 60. In addition to playing cricket for the university, he also represented it and Oxfordshire in field hockey.

Wilson played international hockey for South Africa. Having worked in the oil and mining industries, Wilson set up the African Leadership Institute in 2004.

References

External links

1944 births
Living people
People from Bulawayo
Zimbabwean Rhodes Scholars
Alumni of Keble College, Oxford
Zimbabwean emigrants to South Africa
South African cricketers
Oxford University cricketers
South African male field hockey players